Liu Jun (born March 1957) is a former Chinese politician who spent most of his career in southwest China's Guangxi Zhuang Autonomous Region. He was investigated by China's top anti-graft agency in February 2018. Previously he served as vice chairman of the Guangxi Regional Committee of the Chinese People's Political Consultative Conference and before that, chairman of the Standing Committee of Guilin Municipal People's Congress and party secretary of Guilin.

He was a representative of the 18th National Congress of the Chinese Communist Party and was a delegate to the 10th National People's Congress.

Early life and education
Liu was born in Hengnan County, Hunan, in March 1957. During the late Cultural Revolution, he was a sent-down youth in his home-county. He joined the Chinese Communist Party (CCP) in May 1976. After resuming the college entrance examination in 1978, he was accepted to Central South Forestry College (now Central South University of Forestry and Technology), majoring in wood machining.

Career
In January 1982, he worked in the  after university.

In November 1998, he was assigned to southwest China's Guangxi Zhuang Autonomous Region and appointed vice mayor of Wuzhou. In September 1999, he was appointed head of Organization Department and was admitted to member of the standing committee of the CCP Yulin Municipal Committee, the city's top authority. In July 2000, he was promoted to acting mayor of Beihai, confirmed in September of that same year. He was director of the Administration for Industry and Commerce of Guangxi Zhuang Autonomous Region in June 2004, and held that office until August 2008, when he was despatched to the capital Guilin and appointed party secretary. It would be his first job as "first-in-charge" of a city. He became vice chairman of the Guangxi Regional Committee of the Chinese People's Political Consultative Conference in January 2013, and served until January 2018.

Downfall
On 12 February 2018, he has come under investigation for "serious legal violations" by the ruling Communist Party's corruption watchdog body, the Central Commission for Discipline Inspection (CCDI). He was expelled from the Chinese Communist Party and was demoted to non leadership position at deputy division level.

References

1957 births
Living people
People from Hengnan County
Central South University of Forestry and Technology alumni
Zhongnan University of Economics and Law alumni
People's Republic of China politicians from Hunan
Chinese Communist Party politicians from Hunan
Expelled members of the Chinese Communist Party